Linhe may refer to the following places in China:

Linhe District (临河区), a district in Baynnur, Inner Mongolia
Linhe Subdistrict (林和街道), a subdistrict of Tianhe District, Guangzhou, Guangdong

Towns
Linhe, Jiangsu (临河), in Siyang County, Jiangsu
Linhe, Ningxia (临河), in Lingwu, Ningxia
Linhe, Shaanxi (蔺河), in Langao County, Shaanxi

Townships
Linhe Township, Hebei (临河乡), in Xian County, Hebei
Linhe Township, Henan (临河乡), in Xi County, Henan

See also
Lin He (disambiguation)
Linghe (disambiguation)